Loom is an unincorporated community in Hampshire County, West Virginia, United States. Loom (sometimes referred to as Loom Cemetery) is located between Capon Bridge and Hanging Rock along the Northwestern Turnpike (U.S. Route 50) on the western flanks of Cooper Mountain. Timber Mountain Road (County Route 50/22) and Beck's Gap Road (County Route 50/23) converge at Loom on U.S. Route 50.

The community's name was selected from a postal directory for its brevity.

Historic site 
Central United Methodist Church & Cemetery, US Route 50 East

Image gallery

References

External links 

Unincorporated communities in Hampshire County, West Virginia
Unincorporated communities in West Virginia
Northwestern Turnpike